Kenneth Burns Mulhall (22 September 1927 – 15 May 2022) was an Australian rules footballer who played with St Kilda in the Victorian Football League (VFL).

Family
He is the father of the Australian track and field athlete Gael Patricia Mulhall-Martin (1958-).

Notes

External links 

1927 births
2022 deaths
Australian rules footballers from Victoria (Australia)		
St Kilda Football Club players